Affan Yousuf (born 29 December 1994) is an Indian field hockey player who plays as a forward. He was part of the Indian squad that won the 2016 Asian Men's Hockey Champions Trophy. His father Mohammed Yousuf, grandfather Khuda Dad and uncle Sameer Dad all represented India in field hockey.

It was the experience of watching his dad play hockey that inspired him to take up the game.

References

External links
Player profile at Hockey India

1994 births
Living people
Field hockey players from Bhopal
Indian male field hockey players